The 1962 Miami Redskins football team was an American football team that represented Miami University in the Mid-American Conference (MAC) during the 1962 NCAA University Division football season. In its seventh and final season under head coach John Pont, Miami compiled an 8–2–1 record (3–1–1 against MAC opponents), finished in third place in the MAC, lost to Houston in the 1962 Tangerine Bowl, and outscored all opponents by a combined total of 241 to 175.  The season included a 10-7 victory over No. 9 ranked Purdue a victory ranked among the greatest victories in program history.

The team's statistical leaders included quarterback Ernie Kellermann with 856 passing yards, Scott Tyler with 538 rushing yards, and Bob Jencks with 426 receiving yards.

Gerry Myers and Tom Nomina were the team captains. Nomina and Bob Jencks shared the team's most valuable player award.

Schedule

References

Miami
Miami RedHawks football seasons
Miami Redskins football